"Geraldine" is a 2008 single by Scottish indie rock band Glasvegas. It was released on 23 June 2008 and reached number 16 on the UK Singles Chart, and number one on the NME chart two weeks later. It also reached number one on the Scottish Singles Chart.

According to the NME website:

On the album, the 20 second intro to "Geraldine" is tacked onto the end of preceding song "Flowers & Football Tops," giving "Geraldine" a 3:45 run time. The single version of "Geraldine" includes this intro, making it 4:06. The song was nominated for Best International Song at the 2008 Swedish Rockbjörnen awards.

Track listing
All songs written by James Allan, except where noted.

Promo CD (GOWOW001)
 "Geraldine" (Radio Edit) – 3:24
 "Geraldine" (Album Version) – 4:06
 "Geraldine" (Instrumental) – 4:06

CD (GOWOW002)
 "Geraldine" – 4:06
 "The Prettiest Thing on Saltcoats Beach" – 6:19

7" #1 (GOWOW003)
 Limited numbered edition blue-colored vinyl.
 "Geraldine" – 4:06
 "The Prettiest Thing on Saltcoats Beach" – 6:19

7" #2 (GOWOW004)
 "Geraldine" – 4:06
 "Everybody's Got to Learn Sometime" (The Korgis cover, written by James Warren) – 4:54

Download
 "Geraldine" (Live Acoustic Version) – 3:41

Charts

References

2008 singles
Glasvegas songs
Song recordings produced by Rich Costey
Songs written by James Allan (musician)
2008 songs
Columbia Records singles
Number-one singles in Scotland